Fred Charles Warmbold (September 18, 1875 – August 19, 1926) was an American wrestler who competed in the 1904 Summer Olympics. He was born and died in St. Louis, Missouri. In 1904, he won a bronze medal in heavyweight category.

References

External links
profile

1875 births
1926 deaths
Sportspeople from St. Louis
Wrestlers at the 1904 Summer Olympics
American male sport wrestlers
Olympic bronze medalists for the United States in wrestling
Medalists at the 1904 Summer Olympics